Michael Collins or Mike Collins may refer to:

Arts and entertainment 
 Michael Collins (English actor) (1922–1979), English television actor
 Michael Collins (American author) (a.k.a. Dennis Lynds, 1924–2005), American mystery writer
 Michael Collins (writer and broadcaster) (born 1961), British author, journalist and television presenter
 Mike Collins (comics) (born 1961), British-born American comic book artist
 Michael Collins (Irish author) (born 1964), Irish novelist
 Mick Collins (born 1965), American musician
 Michael Knost (a.k.a. Michael Earl Collins, born 1967), American horror fiction writer 
 Michael Collins (Irish actor) (fl. 1995–2015), Irish actor
 Deathlok (a.k.a. Michael Collins), Marvel comics character

Politics and law

Ireland
 Michael Collins (Irish leader) (1890–1922), Irish revolutionary leader, soldier, and politician
 Michael Collins (Limerick politician) (1940–2022), Irish politician
 Michael Collins (Dublin politician) (fl. 1970s), Irish politician, Lord Mayor of Dublin
 Michael Collins (Schull politician) (born 1968), Irish politician, Cork South–West TD

United States
 Michael F. Collins (1854–1928), American newspaper publisher and politician
 D. Michael Collins (1944–2015), American politician, Mayor of Toledo, Ohio
 Mike Collins (politician) (born 1967), American politician from the state of Georgia
 Mac Collins or Michael Allen Collins (1944–2018), American congressman from Georgia

Science and technology 
 Michael Collins (astronaut) (1930–2021), American astronaut, member of Apollo 11 and Gemini 10 crews
 Michael Collins (computational linguist) (born 1971), British-born researcher in computer science
 Michael Patrick Collins, Canadian structural engineer

Sports

Association football (soccer)
 Michael Collins (soccer) (born 1961), American soccer midfielder
 Michael Collins (footballer, born 1977), Irish footballer
 Michael Collins (footballer, born 1986), Irish and Oxford United professional footballer

Rugby
 Michael Collins (rugby union, born 1974), New Zealand rugby union player, coach and administrator
 Michael Collins (rugby union, born 1986), Welsh rugby union player
 Michael Collins (rugby union, born 1993), New Zealand rugby union player

Other sports
 Mike Collins (American football) (born 1960), American college football coach at the University of Louisiana
 Michael Collins (athlete) (1879–1959), Irish Olympic athlete
 Mike Collins (Australian footballer, born 1939), Australian rules VFL footballer for Melbourne in the 1960s 
 Mike Collins (Australian footballer, born 1953), Australian rules VFL footballer for Melbourne in the 1970s 
 Michael Collins (baseball) (born 1984), Australian baseball player
 Michael Collins (boxer) (fl. 1980s), American boxer
 Michael Collins (cricketer) (born 1958), South African cricketer
 Michael Collins (hurler) (1940–2009), Irish hurler
 Mike Collins (ice hockey) (born 1990), American ice hockey player
 Michael Collins (referee), Gaelic football referee

Others 
 Michael Collins (bishop) (1771–1832), Roman Catholic Bishop of Cloyne and Ross

Other uses
 Michael Collins (film), 1996 film
 Michael Collins (soundtrack)
 Michael Collins (Irish whiskey), Irish whiskey brand

See also
 Michael Collings (disambiguation)

Collins, Michael